Misirgawan  is a village in Hanumana Tehsil in Rewa District of the Indian state of Madhya Pradesh.

Misirgawan's pin code is 486335 and postal head office is Mauganj.

Neighbouring Villages
Malaigawan (3 km), Naun Kalan (1 km), Naunkhurd (3 km), Lasa (6 km), Hanumana (7 km) are the nearby villages to Misirgawan.

Colleges near Misirgawan

References

Villages in Rewa district